The 2018 Milan Ciga Vasojević Cup was the 12th season of the Serbian women's national basketball cup tournament.

Venue

Qualified teams

The draw was held in Belgrade on 8 March 2018.

Bracket

Semifinals

Crvena zvezda v Kraljevo

Partizan 1953 v Radivoj Korać

Final

See also
2017–18 First Women's Basketball League of Serbia
2017–18 Radivoj Korać Cup

References

External links
 Official website 

Milan Ciga Vasojević Cup
Basketball
Serbia